Nicolás Alejandro Ibáñez (born 23 August 1994) is an Argentine professional footballer who plays as a forward for Liga MX club Tigres UANL.

Career

Comunicaciones
Ibáñez's career began in the youth system of Lanús, prior to moving into senior football with Primera B Metropolitana team Comunicaciones in 2015. In his fifth appearance, Ibáñez scored his first goal in a 4–2 defeat against Deportivo Merlo on 14 March. Two weeks later, he received his first red card in a 1–1 draw with Almirante Brown on 27 March. In total, he scored fifteen goals across his first two seasons in fifty-four appearances for Comunicaciones.

Gimnasia y Esgrima
On 1 August 2016, Argentine Primera División side Gimnasia y Esgrima loaned Ibáñez. He scored on his Gimnasia y Esgrima debut during a win over Vélez Sarsfield.

A year after joining the club, Gimnasia y Esgrima signed Ibáñez permanently after seven goals in thirty matches. He scored two goals in the first match following in a 4–4 draw away to Defensa y Justicia.

Atlético San Luis
Nine appearances later, Ibáñez left Gimnasia y Esgrima in January 2018 as he joined Ascenso MX team Atlético San Luis. He made his Mexican football debut on 19 January, coming on as a substitute for Pablo Olivera in a goalless draw against Tampico Madero. Ibáñez made his 100th league appearance in a loss versus Celaya. Ibañez scored his first goal for them on 20 February, in a 2–0 win against Zacatepec.

After netting seven goals in thirteen games in his first campaign, Ibáñez scored twenty-one times in the subsequent 2018–19 regular season which included a four-goal haul versus Celaya on 2 February 2019. He subsequently netted two in six in the play-offs, which the club won after beating Dorados de Sinaloa over two legs to earn a spot in Liga MX while earning them their second consecutive title; he also ended the campaign as the division's top goalscorer.

Atlético de Madrid
On 5 June 2019, Atlético de Madrid, who hold an ownership stake in Atlético San Luis, announced the signing of Ibáñez; effective from July. He was immediately loaned back to the Mexican side on 1 July.

Atlético San Luis loan
Ibáñez appeared for his Liga MX bow on 20 July 2019 in a home loss to UNAM. He netted in an exhibition match against his parent team on 3 August, putting his side ahead before the La Liga club overturned the deficit to win. Ibáñez scored fourteen goals across 2019–20, notably netting braces home and away against León. He made his 200th career appearance on 6 November 2020 against Puebla.

Pachuca
On 2021, he arrived to Pachuca, and became a key player to the Apertura 2022 season Liga MX championship, finishing the regular season as top goal scorer of the League.

Tigres UANL
On 18 January 2023, Ibáñez joined Tigres UANL.

Career statistics

Honours
Atlético San Luis
Ascenso MX: Apertura 2018, Clausura 2019

Pachuca
Liga MX: Apertura 2022

Individual
Ascenso MX Top Scorer: Apertura 2018, Clausura 2019
Liga MX All-Star: 2021
Liga MX Best XI: Clausura 2022
Liga MX Top Scorer: Apertura 2022

References

External links

Ascenso MX profile

1994 births
Living people
People from General López Department
Argentine footballers
Association football forwards
Argentine expatriate footballers
Expatriate footballers in Spain
Argentine expatriate sportspeople in Spain
Expatriate footballers in Mexico
Argentine expatriate sportspeople in Mexico
Primera B Metropolitana players
Argentine Primera División players
Ascenso MX players
Liga MX players
Club Comunicaciones footballers
Club de Gimnasia y Esgrima La Plata footballers
Atlético San Luis footballers
Atlético Madrid footballers
Sportspeople from Santa Fe Province